Events in the year 2013 in Cyprus.

Incumbents 

 President: Demetris Christofias (until 28 February); Nicos Anastasiades (from 28 February)
 President of the Parliament: Yiannakis Omirou

Events
Ongoing – 2012–2013 Cypriot financial crisis; Cyprus dispute

February 
17 February – Voters in Cyprus go to the polls for a presidential election with Nicos Anastasiades of the Democratic Rally and Stavros Malas of AKEL to contest a runoff on 24 February. The runoff election is won by Nicos Anastasiades.

March 
16 March
Cyprus defeat Bulgaria 79–10 in the European Nations Cup Second Division to earn their 18th consecutive Test victory. This at least ties the all-time record for consecutive Test wins, and (depending on the source) may be a new record.
A deal is reached between Cyprus and the EC–ECB–IMF troika. The terms of the €10 billion "bailout" package cause widespread anger among Cypriots who queue from early morning to withdraw their savings as it emerges that up to 10% of each citizen's deposits are to be wiped out to raise billions. The plan is overwhelmingly rejected by Cypriot lawmakers on March 19.
20 March – President of Cyprus Nicos Anastasiades presents a new bailout package for Cypriot banks as Cyprus is hit with a liquidity crisis.
22 March – Minister of Finance of Cyprus Michael Sarris says that his talks with officials in Russia about a possible rescue package for Cypriot banks have led nowhere.
23 March – The Cyprus Parliament approves three bills that aim to raise enough money to qualify the country for a broader bailout package and stave off financial collapse.
24 March – President Nicos Anastasiades begins a series of emergency meetings in Brussels in a last-ditch attempt to finalize a bailout.
25 March – Cyprus reportedly reaches an outline bank bailout deal with international lenders including the EU, the ECB and the IMF. Eurozone finance ministers approve the deal, which includes a radical downsizing of the island's Russian-fueled financial sector.
26 March – The Ministry of Finance says banks will remain shut until Thursday to give regulators time to guard against a run on deposits, and that big depositors in Cypriot banks can lose up to 40% of their funds, while depositors with less than 100,000 euros in their accounts will not be affected by bailout plans.
28 March – Security tightens in Cyprus as banks prepare to reopen after nearly two weeks, following a controversial international bailout that was negotiated with the EU and IMF.
29 March – President Nicos Anastasiades says the island has no intention of abandoning the euro, despite the tough conditions imposed by its 10 billion euro bailout deal with the EU and IMF.

April 
2 April – Cypriot Finance Minister Michael Sarris resigns after completing talks on a controversial bailout deal and will be replaced by current Labour Minister Charis Georgiades.
12 April – E.U. finance ministers and central bank governors begin a two-day meeting at Dublin Castle to talk about austerity, the collapse of the Cypriot economy and the creation of a federal bank.

August 
29 August – Britain sends six Typhoon fighter jets to the country in order to guard against potential retaliation by the Assad regime in the event of air strikes against Syria.

Deaths

7 February – Niki Marangou, writer and painter (b. 1948).
29 April – Marianna Zachariadi, pole vaulter (b. 1990).
15 November – Glafcos Clerides, politician, President (b. 1919).

References

 
2010s in Cyprus
Years of the 21st century in Cyprus
Cyprus
Cyprus
Cyprus